Siméon Oualli (born 18 February 1928 – 17 March 2002) was a Guadeloupean clergyman and bishop for the Roman Catholic Diocese of Basse-Terre. Oualli was born in Saint-François, Guadeloupe. He became ordained in 1957. He was appointed bishop in 1970. He died on 17 March 2002, at the age of 74.

References

1928 births
2002 deaths
People from Saint-François, Guadeloupe
20th-century Roman Catholic bishops in Guadeloupe
21st-century Roman Catholic bishops in Guadeloupe
Roman Catholic bishops of Basse-Terre
Guadeloupean Roman Catholic bishops